Maxine Blythin (born 25 August 1994) is an English cricketer who currently plays for Kent. She plays as a right-handed batter. She previously played for South East Stars.

Early life
Blythin was born on 25 August 1994 and grew up near Canterbury. Blythin is transgender, and transitioned to female in her teenage years.

Domestic career
Blythin made her county debut in 2019, for Kent against Nottinghamshire in a County Championship match, in which she scored 43. Blythin went on to be Kent's third-highest Championship run-scorer that season, scoring 165 runs at an average of 33.00, including her maiden county half-century, scoring 51* against Hampshire. Blythin then went on to be Kent's leading run-scorer in the 2019 Women's Twenty20 Cup, with 175 runs at an average of 29.16. Blythin was subsequently named the Kent Women Club Player of the Year for 2019. In 2021, she only played in the Women's London Championship, scoring 135 runs including 94 made against Sussex.

In 2020, Blythin played for South East Stars in the Rachael Heyhoe Flint Trophy. She appeared in two matches, scoring 56 runs with a top score of 50 against Western Storm.

References

External links

1994 births
Living people
Place of birth missing (living people)
Transgender women
Transgender sportspeople
Kent women cricketers
South East Stars cricketers
English LGBT sportspeople
LGBT cricketers